The Round Barn, Norway Township is a historical building located in rural Norway Township, Winnebago County, Iowa, United States. It was built in 1920 as a dairy and horse barn. The building is a true round barn that measures  in diameter. It is constructed of clay tile from the Johnston Brothers' Clay Works in Webster County. It features an aerator, conical roof and a hay dormer on the south side. The barn has been listed on the National Register of Historic Places since 1987.

References

Buildings and structures completed in 1920
Buildings and structures in Winnebago County, Iowa
Barns on the National Register of Historic Places in Iowa
Norwegian-American culture in Iowa
Round barns in Iowa
National Register of Historic Places in Winnebago County, Iowa